Chueca is an area of central Madrid, named after its main square, Plaza de Chueca. It is known as Madrid's gay neighborhood. Plaza de Chueca was named after Spanish composer and author Federico Chueca.   

It is located in the administrative ward in the central Madrid neighbourhood of Justicia. 

Chueca  is very lively, with many street cafes and boutique shops. Lonely Planet describes it as "extravagantly gay, lively young, and always inclusive regardless of your sexual orientation."

Places of interest 
San Anton Church, which contains the bones of Saint Valentine
Mercado de San Antón
Plaza de Chueca
Museo del Romanticismo

Art in Chueca 
In the later half of the 2010s, Chueca had become a centre for gay art. The Festival Visible which takes place every year during the Gay Pride, has included works by Jean Cocteau, Wilhelm van Gloeden, David Hochney, Tom of Finland, Roberto González Fernández or David Trullo. Shows such as "De bares hacia la exposicion" by Daniel Garbade in (2011) or the Illustrations : Chueca by Miguel Navia (2014) reflect through drawings and paintings the gay-neighbourhood.

Chueca is a favourite set for movies. Eloy de la Iglesias’s last production: Bulgarian Lovers (2003), an adaptation of the homonymous novel by  Eduardo Mendicutti, was shot in the neighbourhood, as were other films such as Truman by Cesc Gay, Boystown by Juan Flahn, Cachorro by Miguel Albaladejo, and Chef's special by Nacho G. Velilla.

Notable residents 
 Danish-American actor Viggo Mortensen and his partner Ariadna Gil.

See also
Chueca (Madrid Metro)
Justicia
Malasaña
LGBT history in Spain
Gay village
Gay neighborhoods in Spain

References 

Neighbourhoods of Madrid
LGBT culture in Spain
Gay villages in Spain